The 2022 GEICO 500 was a NASCAR Cup Series race held on April 24, 2022, at Talladega Superspeedway in Lincoln, Alabama. Contested over 188 laps on the 2.66 mile (4.28 km) superspeedway, it was the 10th race of the 2022 NASCAR Cup Series season.

Report

Background
Talladega Superspeedway, formerly known as Alabama International Motor Speedway, is a motorsports complex located north of Talladega, Alabama. It is located on the former Anniston Air Force Base in the small city of Lincoln. A tri-oval, the track was constructed in 1969 by the International Speedway Corporation, a business controlled by the France family. Talladega is most known for its steep banking. The track currently hosts NASCAR's Cup Series, Xfinity Series and Camping World Truck Series. Talladega is the longest NASCAR oval with a length of 2.66-mile-long (4.28 km) tri-oval like the Daytona International Speedway, which is 2.5-mile-long (4.0 km).

Entry list
 (R) denotes rookie driver.
 (i) denotes driver who is ineligible for series driver points.

Qualifying

Qualifying results

Race

Stage Results

Stage One
Laps: 60

Stage Two
Laps: 60

Final Stage Results

Stage Three
Laps: 68

Race statistics
 Lead changes: 41 among 16 different drivers
 Cautions/Laps: 6 for 28
 Red flags: 0
 Time of race: 3 hours, 21 minutes and 52 seconds
 Average speed:

Media

Television
Fox Sports covered their 22nd race at the Talladega Superspeedway. Mike Joy, Clint Bowyer and six-time Talladega winner Dale Earnhardt Jr. called the race from the broadcast booth. Jamie Little, Regan Smith and Vince Welch handled pit road for the television side. Larry McReynolds and Jamie McMurray provided insight from the Fox Sports studio in Charlotte.

Radio 
MRN had the radio call for the race which was also simulcast on Sirius XM NASCAR Radio. Alex Hayden, Jeff Striegle, and Rusty Wallace called the race in the booth when the field raced through the tri-oval. Dave Moody called the race from the Sunoco spotters stand outside turn 2 when the field raced through turns 1 and 2. Mike Bagley called the race from a platform inside the backstretch when the field raced down the backstretch. Dillon Welch called the race from the Sunoco spotters stand outside turn 4 when the field races through turns 3 and 4. Steve Post, Jason Toy and Chris Wilner worked pit road for the radio side.

Standings after the race

Drivers' Championship standings

Manufacturers' Championship standings

Note: Only the first 16 positions are included for the driver standings.
. – Driver has clinched a position in the NASCAR Cup Series playoffs.

References

GEICO 500
GEICO 500
GEICO 500
NASCAR races at Talladega Superspeedway